Wrist pain or open wrist is a type of syndrome that prevents the patient using their hand due to a painful wrist. The pain may be sharp, sometimes steadily increasing after trying to apply force. Typically pain is caused after exerting too strong a demand on the wrist, as is the case with weight lifters, athletes in general, or with any weight-bearing activity to the wrist.

Remedies and causes
 After applying hot or cold pads in the first moments, if there is no inflammation, the use of a simple leather or neoprene wrist brace (or even a steel-reinforced one),  is recommended in order to rest the wrist.

Wrist pain can be caused by one or more of a number of different disorders, such as:

Carpal tunnel syndrome
Wrist osteoarthritis
Kienbock's disease
Scaphoid fracture
Scapholunate dissociation
Carpal boss
Ganglion cyst
Ulnar nerve entrapment, sometimes due to wrist or elbow abnormalities such as Guyon's canal syndrome or cubital tunnel syndrome
Wrist fracture, wrist sprain
Tendonitis wrist (Extensor) or thumb (DeQuervains)
Psoriatic arthritis

See also
Sprained ankle
Wrist brace

References

Bibliography

Pain